The Old Wan Chai Post Office is the oldest surviving post office building in Hong Kong. It is situated at No. 221 Queen's Road East, at the junction with Wan Chai Gap Road.

History
The building was erected between 1912 and 1913, and opened on 1 March 1915 as the Wan Chai Post Office. It is not known whether the building was originally built and designed for such purpose. The post office ceased to operate in 1992, after having served the Wan Chai community continuously for 77 years.

Features
The Old Wan Chai Post Office is an L-shaped building. It is a simple pitched-roof structure with attractive gable ends and mouldings.

Environmental Resource Centre
The building is now operated by the Environmental Protection Department as an Environmental Resource Centre.

Conservation
The Old Wan Chai Post Office became a declared monument on 18 May 1990. It is the only building declared as a monument in the Wan Chai area.

See also

 Declared monuments of Hong Kong
 List of buildings and structures in Hong Kong
 Wan Chai District
 Wan Chai Heritage Trail

References

External links
 
Wan Chai Environmental Resource Centre
Film Service Office

1913 establishments in Hong Kong
Declared monuments of Hong Kong
Government buildings completed in 1913
History museums in Hong Kong
Nature centres in Hong Kong
Post office buildings in Hong Kong
Queen's Road East
Wan Chai